San José de las Lajas Municipal Museum is a museum located in the 47th avenue in San José de las Lajas, Cuba. It was established on 28 January 1979.

The museum holds collections on history, weaponry, numismatics and archeology.

See also 
 List of museums in Cuba

References 

Museums in Cuba
Museum
Buildings and structures in Mayabeque Province
Museums established in 1979
1979 establishments in Cuba
20th-century architecture in Cuba